Pi is the Mandarin pinyin romanization of the Chinese surname written  in Chinese character. It is romanized P'i in Wade–Giles, and Pei in Cantonese. Pi is listed 85th in the Song dynasty classic text Hundred Family Surnames. According to a 2008 study, it was not among the 300 most common surnames in China. However a 2013 study found that it was the 279th most common name, being shared by 229,000 people or 0.017% of the population, with the province with the most people being Hunan.

The same surname is also a Korean family name, shared by 6,578 people in South Korea in 2015.

Notable people
 Pi Rixiu (ca. 834–883), Tang dynasty poet
 Pi Guangye (877–943), chancellor of the Wuyue Kingdom
 Pi Xirui (皮錫瑞; 1850–1908), Qing dynasty Confucianist
 Pi Zongshi (1887–1967), President of Hunan University
 Ignatius Pi Shushi (1897–1978), archbishop of the Roman Catholic Archdiocese of Shenyang
 Pi Dingjun (皮定钧; 1914–1976), PLA lieutenant general
 Pi Hongyan (born 1979), Chinese-born French badminton player

References

Chinese-language surnames
Individual Chinese surnames